Barry Keith Grant is a Canadian-American critic, educator, author and editor who best known for his work on science fiction films, horror films and popular music.

Grant is recognized as one of the leading experts on the work of American documentary filmmaker Frederick Wiseman. An Elected Fellow of the Royal Society of Canada, Grant has authored or edited more than two dozen books on these subjects, several of which have become standard course texts on film studies. He has also been a featured critic on CBC radio.

Career

Grant earned his Ph.D. from the State University of New York at Buffalo in American literature and film studies in 1975. From 1975-2016 he taught at Brock University in St. Catharines, Ontario, Canada, where he helped develop the undergraduate program in film studies, one of the first in Canada, as well as the country's only graduate program in popular culture. He served as the founding director of that program from 2002-2004 and before that as the founding chair of the interdisciplinary Department of Fine Arts in the 1980s.

Since 1995 Grant has served as editor of the Contemporary Approaches to Film and Media series for Wayne State University Press, which also includes the innovative "TV Milestones" series. Grant is also the editor of the New Approaches to Film and Media series, originally with Cambridge University Press and now published by Wiley-Blackwell. He has or is currently serving on the editorial boards or advisory editorial boards of Cinema Journal, Literature/Film Quarterly, Canadian Journal of Film Studies, Science Fiction Studies, and Science Fiction Film and Television.  Grant was Editor-in-Chief of the four-volume Schirmer Encyclopedia of Film, an award-winning reference work involving contributions from 100 scholars around the world.

Grant is the recipient of the Distinguished Academic Award from the Canadian Association of University Teachers in 2010 and the Society of Cinema and Media Studies Pedagogy Award in 2009. He was the first Canadian film studies scholar to be elected a Fellow of the Royal Society of Canada in 2010.

Bibliography

Books

Monster Cinema. New Brunswick, NJ: Rutgers University Press, 2018.
100 Science Fiction Films.  London: British Film Institute/ Palgrave Macmillan, 2013.
The Hollywood Film Musical.  Malden, MA: Blackwell, 2012.
Shadows of Doubt: Negotiations of Masculinity in American Genre Films.  Detroit: Wayne State University Press, 2011.
Invasion of the Body Snatchers. London: British Film Institute/ Palgrave Macmillan, 2010.
100 Documentary Films (with Jim Hillier).  London: British Film Institute, 2009.
Film Genre: From Iconography to Ideology.  London and New York: Wallflower Press, 2007.
The Film Studies Dictionary (with Steve Blandford and Jim Hillier). London, UK: Arnold/ New York: Oxford, 2001. Japanese Translation: Tokyo: Film Art-sha, 2003.
Voyages of Discovery: The Cinema of Frederick Wiseman.  Urbana and Chicago: University of Illinois Press, 1992.

Books edited

Wood, Robin. Robin Wood on the Horror Film, ed. Barry Keith Grant. Detroit: Wayne State University Press, 2018.
Wood, Robin. The Apu Trilogy, expanded edition, ed. Barry Keith Grant.  Detroit: Wayne State University Press, 2016.
Grant, Barry Keith, and Malisa Kurtz, eds.  Notions of Genre: Writings on Popular Film before Genre Theory.  Austin: University of Texas Press, 2016.
Grant, Barry Keith, ed.  The Dread of Difference: Gender and the Horror Film, 2nd edition. Austin: University of Texas Press, 2015.
Wood, Robin.  Arthur Penn, expanded edition, ed. Barry Keith Grant.  Detroit: Wayne State University Press, 2014.
Grant, Barry Keith, and Jeannette Sloniowski, eds. Documenting the Documentary: Close Readings of Documentary Film and Video, 2nd ed.  Detroit: Wayne State University Press, 2014.
Grant, Barry Keith, ed.  Film Genre Reader IV. Austin: University of Texas Press, 2012. Wood, Robin.  Ingmar Bergman, expanded edition, ed. Barry Keith Grant.  Detroit: Wayne State University Press, 2012.
Fox, Alistair, Barry Keith Grant, and Hilary Radner, eds.  New Zealand Cinema: Interpreting the Past.  Bristol, UK: Intellect, 2011.
Nicks, Joan, and Barry Keith Grant, eds.  Covering Niagara: Popular Culture and the Local.  Waterloo, ON: Wilfrid Laurier University Press, 2010.
Grant, Barry Keith, ed.  The Collected Film Criticism of Andrew Britton.  Detroit: Wayne State University Press, 2009.
Grant, Barry Keith, ed.  American Cinema and the 1960s: Themes and Variations (Screen Decades series). New Brunswick: Rutgers University Press, 2008.
Grant, Barry Keith, ed.  Auteurs and Authorship: A Film Reader.  Malden, MA: Blackwell Publishing, 2007.
Grant, Barry Keith, Editor-in-Chief.  Schirmer Encyclopedia of Film, 4 vols. Detroit and New York: Thomson Gale, 2006.
Grant, Barry Keith, ed.  Five Films by Frederick Wiseman. Berkeley and Los Angeles: University of California Press, 2006.
Grant, Barry Keith, and Christopher Sharrett, eds.  Planks of Reason: Essays on the Horror Film,  revised ed.  Lanham, MD: Scarecrow Press, 2004.
Grant, Barry Keith, ed.  Film Genre Reader III.  Austin: University of Texas Press, 2003.
Grant, Barry Keith, ed.  Fritz Lang: Interviews.  Jackson: University Press of Mississippi, 2003.
Grant, Barry Keith, ed.  John Ford's Stagecoach.  New York and Cambridge: Cambridge University Press, 2002.
Grant, Barry Keith and Jeannette Sloniowski, eds.  Documenting the Documentary: Close Readings of Documentary Film and Video.  Detroit: Wayne State University Press, 1998.
Grant, Barry Keith, ed.  The Dread of Difference: Gender and the Horror Film.  Austin: University of Texas Press, 1996.
Grant, Barry Keith, ed.  Film Genre Reader II.  Austin: University of Texas Press, 1995.
Grant, Barry Keith, ed.  Film Genre Reader.  Austin: University of Texas Press, 1986.
Grant, Barry Keith, ed.  Planks of Reason: Essays on the Horror Film.  Metuchen, NJ: Scarecrow Press, 1984. 428 pp.
Grant, Barry Keith, ed.  Film Study in the Undergraduate Curriculum.  New York: Modern Language Association, 1983.
Grant, Barry Keith, ed.  Film Genre: Theory and Criticism.  Metuchen, NJ: Scarecrow Press, 1977.

References

Living people
Canadian film historians
Academic staff of Brock University
Year of birth missing (living people)
Place of birth missing (living people)
University at Buffalo alumni
Book editors
Academic journal editors
Fellows of the Royal Society of Canada
Wayne State University people